This is a discography of Caribou Records releases.

Albums 

Discographies of American record labels